Never So Live is the third EP by Australian hard rock band the Angels, released in 1981. The EP peaked at number 17 on the Kent Music Report.

Track listing

Personnel 
 John Brewster – rhythm guitar, vocals
 Rick Brewster – lead guitar, vocals
 Doc Neeson – lead vocals
 Chris Bailey – bass, vocals
 Brent Eccles – drums

Charts

References

The Angels (Australian band) albums
Epic Records live albums
Epic Records EPs
1981 EPs
1981 live albums
EPs by Australian artists
Live albums by Australian artists
Live EPs